Lakeview Arena is a 3,100-seat multi-purpose arena, located in Marquette, Michigan. It opened in 1974, during the Marquette Iron Rangers hockey season. The team had previously played in the historic Palestra, a building that had moved from Laurium, Michigan in 1921 and was torn down shortly after Lakeview opened. From 1976 to 1999, it was the home of Northern Michigan University's hockey program, and it was there, during the 1990–91 season, that the Wildcats posted a perfect home record on their way to the 1991 NCAA Division I Men's Ice Hockey Tournament.

KISS performed at the arena during their Animalize Tour on March 20, 1985, during their Crazy Nights Tour on January 5, 1988, and during their Hot in The Shade Tour on October 4, 1990. Today, the building is used for local hockey programs, as well as other events and conventions in the city. It was also home to the Marquette Rangers of the NAHL between 2006 and 2010, before they moved to Flint. It became home to the newly revived Marquette Iron Rangers in the Great Lakes Hockey League's 2015-16 season. After that season, the team folded and was replaced by the Marquette Mutineers. Also The AWA had two wrestling events there on October 9, 1983 headlined by Hulk Hogan and on May 20, 1984. On January 15, 1987 Jim Cricket Promotions had a NWA event with Ric Flair main eventing. 

Lakeview is owned by the city and operated by the Parks and Recreation Department.

Lakeview won the Kraft Hockeyville USA contest on April 30, 2016. The arena received $150,000 in upgrades, and hosted the Buffalo Sabres and Carolina Hurricanes on October 4, 2016 in a preseason NHL contest. Buffalo won the game 2-0.

References

External links 
 Lakeview Arena at the City of Marquette website
 Link to Mining Journal article on final game at Palestra

Indoor ice hockey venues in the United States
Buildings and structures in Marquette, Michigan
Sports venues in Michigan
Defunct college ice hockey venues in the United States
Sports venues completed in 1974